Plum Bottom Creek is a stream located entirely within Geauga County, Ohio.

Plum Bottom was named for the wild plum trees along its course.

See also
List of rivers of Ohio

References

Rivers of Geauga County, Ohio
Rivers of Ohio